Aatamin poika is a 1996 Finnish TV film drama lasting 45 minutes. The TV short film was directed and written by Heikki Veijola starring Meri Nenonen. It aired on the 21 April 1996 on Yle TV2.

Cast 

Meri Nenonen ....  Mari Nuotio 
Ari-Kyösti Seppo ....  Jyrki Alinen 
Risto Kaskilahti ....  Timonen 
Kai Lehtinen ....  Väinö Alinen 
Pertti Sveholm ....  Mäkelä 
Martti Katajisto ....  Kauppias

References

External links
 

1990s Finnish-language films
Finnish television films
1996 television films
1996 films